Girard is a city in southern Trumbull County, Ohio, United States, along the Mahoning River. The population was 9,603 at the 2020 census. Located directly north of Youngstown, it is a suburb of the Youngstown–Warren metropolitan area.

History
It is believed that Girard takes its name from Stephen Girard, a French American philanthropist who was the founder of the Girard Bank and Girard College in Philadelphia, Pennsylvania. It was first settled in 1800 but remained static until the Ohio and Erie Canal was completed.

Geography
Girard is located at  (41.158607, −80.695558).

Demographics

2010 census
As of the census of 2010, there were 9,958 people, 4,307 households, and 2,663 families residing in the city. The racial makeup of the city was 93.2% White, 4.0% African American, 0.1% Native American, 0.3% Asian, 0.2% from other races, and 2.2% from two or more races. Hispanic or Latino of any race were 2.1% of the population.

There were 4,307 households, of which 28.6% had children under the age of 18 living with them, 39.9% were married couples living together, 16.4% had a female householder with no husband present, 5.5% had a male householder with no wife present, and 38.2% were non-families. 32.9% of all households were made up of individuals, and 14.1% had someone living alone who was 65 years of age or older. The average household size was 2.31 and the average family size was 2.92.

The median age in the city was 41.8 years. 21.9% of residents were under the age of 18; 8.9% were between the ages of 18 and 24; 23.1% were from 25 to 44; 28.9% were from 45 to 64; and 17.1% were 65 years of age or older. The gender makeup of the city was 46.7% male and 53.3% female.

Government

Girard has a statutory form of government as drawn up by the Ohio Revised Code. It has 7 member City Council, and a Council President, of which all 8 serve 2 year terms and elected by the voters of the city. There are no term limits. Girard's other elected positions are Mayor, Auditor, Law Director and Treasurer, all of which serve 4 year terms, and are without term limits.

Education
Children in Girard are served by the Girard City School District. Girard City Schools are overseen by a 5 member Board of Education chosen by the electorate of the school district to 4 year terms, without term limits. The current schools serving Girard are:
 Prospect Elementary School – grades PK-3; Blue Ribbon School
 Girard Intermediate Middle School – grades 4-6
 Girard Junior High School – grades 7-8
 Girard High School – grades 9-12

In addition, the St. Rose Elementary School is overseen by the Roman Catholic Diocese of Youngstown for children in grades PK-8 as a private option.

Notable people
 Stiv Bators, punk rock musician
 Kathleen Bradley, Barker's Beauties member on The Price Is Right
 George Cappuzzello, Major League Baseball pitcher
 Mark Dailey, television journalist for CityNews and CITY-DT
 Delos Drake, Major League Baseball outfielder
 Pat Meyer, National Football League offensive line coach & former player
 Bill Triplett, National Football League running back 
 Mel Triplett, National Football League running back

References

External links
 A Brief History of Girard, Ohio—at the Girard Free Library Web site

Cities in Trumbull County, Ohio
French-American culture in Ohio
Populated places established in 1802
1802 establishments in the Northwest Territory
Cities in Ohio